FH1/FH2 domain-containing protein 1 is a protein that in humans is encoded by the FHOD1 gene.

This gene encodes a protein which is a member of the formin/diaphanous family of proteins. The gene is ubiquitously expressed but is found in abundance in the spleen. The encoded protein has sequence homology to diaphanous and formin proteins within the Formin Homology (FH)1 and FH2 domains. It also contains a coiled-coil domain, a collagen-like domain, two nuclear localization signals, and several potential PKC and PKA phosphorylation sites. It is a predominantly cytoplasmic protein and is expressed in a variety of human cell lines.

Interactions 

FHOD1 has been shown to interact with RAC1.

References

Further reading